Ỽ, ỽ (Middle Welsh V) is a letter employed in Middle Welsh texts between the 13th and 14th centuries. It represented the sounds of v, u, and w and  prior to inclusion in the Latin Extended Additional block of Unicode characters  was typically represented by the letter w in transcriptions. The Unicode code point for the capital letter is U+1EFC; that for the lower-case letter is U+1EFD.

It is related to the Anglo-Saxon letter wynn, Ƿ.

References

External links
 Ỽ at charbase.com

Welsh language
Latin-script letters